Bignold is a surname. Notable people with the surname include:

Arthur Bignold (1839–1915), British politician
Marie Bignold (1927–2018), Australian politician
Pam Bignold (born 1982), Australian soccer player
Samuel Bignold (1791–1875), British businessman
Thomas Bignold (1761–1835), British businessman